"Soon as I Get Home" is a song by the American R&B recording artist Faith Evans. It was written by Evans and Sean Combs for her debut studio album Faith (1995) and released as the album's second single following "You Used to Love Me". The song peaked at number 21 on the US Billboard Hot 100 chart and number 3 on the Hot R&B/Hip-Hop Songs chart. The single has been certified Gold by the RIAA.

Track listings
US CD Maxi single
 "Soon as I Get Home" (Radio Edit) - 4:16
 "Soon as I Get Home" (Album version) - 5:24
 "Soon as I Get Home" (Instrumental) - 5:29
 "No Other Love" (Album version) - 4:24
 "You Used to Love Me" (Puff Daddy Mix) - 4:32

US CD Remix single
 "Soon as I Get Home" (Album version) - 5:24
 "Soon as I Get Home (Remix)" (featuring Aaron Hall) - 4:59		
 "Soon as I Get Home" (Instrumental) - 5:29

Credits
Producer – Chucky Thompson and Sean "Puffy" Combs* (tracks: 1, 3)
Remix – Sean "Puffy" Combs and Stevie J (tracks: 2)
Remix [Co-Remixed] – Chad Elliot (tracks: 2)
Written-By – Aaron Hall (tracks: 2), Chucky Thompson (tracks: 1, 3), Faith Evans, Sean Combs, Steven Jordan (tracks: 2)

Charts

Weekly charts

Year-end charts

Certifications

References

1995 singles
Faith Evans songs
Songs written by Sean Combs
1995 songs
Bad Boy Records singles
Songs written by Faith Evans
Contemporary R&B ballads
1990s ballads